Lypha is a genus of flies in the family Tachinidae.

Species
L. cristiverpa O'Hara, 2002
L. dubia (Fallén, 1810)
L. frontalis Brooks, 1945
L. fumipennis Brooks, 1945
L. melobosis (Walker, 1849)
L. parva Brooks, 1945
L. ruficauda (Zetterstedt, 1838)
L. setifacies (West, 1925)

References

Tachininae
Tachinidae genera
Taxa named by Jean-Baptiste Robineau-Desvoidy